The 1992–93 London Crusaders season was the thirteenth in the club's history. It was their second season under the name of the London Crusaders, after over a decade under the Fulham RLFC name. They competed in the 1992–93 Second Division of the Rugby Football League. They also competed in the 1993 Challenge Cup, 1992–93 Lancashire Cup and the 1992–93 League Cup. They finished the season in 5th place in the second tier of British professional rugby league.

Second Division Final Standings

References

External links
Rugby League Project

London Broncos seasons
London Broncos season
1992 in rugby league by club
1992 in English rugby league
London Broncos season
1993 in rugby league by club
1993 in English rugby league